Uranium monosulfide is an inorganic chemical compound of uranium and sulfur.

References

Uranium compounds
Sulfides
Rock salt crystal structure